Nondeterminism or nondeterministic may refer to:

Computer science
Nondeterministic programming
Nondeterministic algorithm
Nondeterministic model of computation
Nondeterministic finite automaton
Nondeterministic Turing machine
Indeterminacy in computation (disambiguation)

Other
Indeterminism (philosophy)

See also
Indeterminacy (disambiguation)